is a Japanese politician and former announcer of TV Asahi, who serves as a member of the House of Councillors of the National Diet (parliament of Japan). She is a member of the Liberal Democratic Party. She served as the head of the Women's Affairs Office of the LDP in October 2009.

She graduated from the University of Tokyo with the Bachelor of Economics degree in 1993.

The 2007 House of Councillors election marked her entry into politics. The documentary film "Pictures at an Election" covers some of her campaign.

She is married to Taku Otsuka (a member of the House of Representatives). Their wedding ceremony was held in Meiji Shrine on 16 June 2008.

Marukawa has served twice as Minister of State for the Tokyo Olympic and Paralympic Games. She first served in the role under Prime Minister Shinzo Abe from August 2016 until August 2017. She was named to the post a second time by Yoshihide Suga on 18 February 2021 to replace fellow LDP lawmaker and former Olympian Seiko Hashimoto, who had resigned from her Cabinet post in order to take over as President of the Tokyo 2020 Organizing Committee.

She was affiliated with the nationalist organisation Nippon Kaigi.

References

External links 
  
 Profile on LDP website 

1971 births
Living people
People from Kobe
University of Tokyo alumni
Female members of the House of Councillors (Japan)
Members of the House of Councillors (Japan)
Spouses of Japanese politicians
TV Asahi
Liberal Democratic Party (Japan) politicians
Women government ministers of Japan
Environment ministers of Japan
21st-century Japanese politicians
21st-century Japanese women politicians
Recipients of the Paralympic Order
Members of Nippon Kaigi